Benjamin Pringle (November 9, 1807 – June 7, 1887) was a United States representative from New York. Born in Richfield Springs, Otsego County, he completed preparatory studies, studied law, was admitted to the bar in 1830 and practiced for a number of years. He was president of a bank in Batavia, Genesee County and was judge of the Genesee County Court from 1841 to 1846.

Pringle was elected as a Whig to the Thirty-third Congress and reelected as an Opposition Party candidate to the Thirty-fourth Congress, holding office from March 4, 1853, to March 3, 1857. During the Thirty-fourth Congress, he was chairman of the Committee on Indian Affairs. He was an unsuccessful candidate for reelection in 1856 to the Thirty-fifth Congress and was a member of the New York State Assembly (Genesee Co.) in 1862. Pringle was appointed by President Abraham Lincoln in 1863 judge of the court of arbitration in Cape Town (in what is now South Africa) under the treaty with Great Britain of April 7, 1862 for the suppression of the African slave trade. He was appointed a member of the board of trustees of the State Institution for the Blind in 1873, and in 1887 died in Hastings, Dakota County, Minnesota. Interment was in the Old Cemetery, Batavia.

References

1807 births
1887 deaths
People from Richfield Springs, New York
Whig Party members of the United States House of Representatives from New York (state)
Opposition Party members of the United States House of Representatives from New York (state)
Members of the New York State Assembly
People from Genesee County, New York
19th-century American politicians